In computing, a legacy port is a computer port or connector that is considered by some to be fully or partially superseded. The replacement ports usually provide most of the functionality of the legacy ports with higher speeds, more compact design, or plug and play and hot swap capabilities for greater ease of use. Modern PC motherboards use separate Super I/O controllers to provide legacy ports, since current chipsets do not offer direct support for them. A category of computers called legacy-free PCs omits these ports, typically retaining only USB for external expansion.

USB adapters are often used to provide legacy ports if they are required on systems not equipped with them.

Common legacy ports

See also
Legacy encoding
Legacy system

References

Computer buses
Legacy hardware